Annan Academy is a secondary school in Annan, in Dumfries and Galloway, Scotland. The present school is the result of an amalgamation in 1921 of the original Annan Academy and Greenknowe Public School, although its history goes back to the 17th century.

Behind the buildings are the school's sports playing fields which additionally play host to local fairs and other outdoor functions such as the annual national pipe band competition. Adjacent to the school's main car and coach park, which is situated at the front of the buildings, lies the Annan public swimming baths and associated car park.

History
The original Annan Academy, founded in 1802, was housed in a building in the town's Port St until 1820, when the council built new school premises in Ednam St. From there it moved to further new buildings in Greenknowe in 1840, and these were later replaced by larger ones with a distinctive bell-tower in 1895, which are still in use today and house the school's library; the original building was built by George McIldowie. The latter red sandstone buildings were joined during an expansion in the 1960s by several new buildings of contemporary style and construction, enabling it to accept more pupils from a wider catchment area. In the early 2010s the former tech area which was a joined onto the school was demolished. This allowed way for a new Performing Arts Building, which allows for a better experience of Music and Drama. Since then much of the school has undergone more changes such as new lights and floors in classrooms, as well as lockers being added for pupils. In 2017 a Gym was added to the former common room and bike sheds were erected.

Feeder schools
 Elmvale (Annan)
 Hecklegirth (Annan)
 Gretna
 Brydekirk
 Newington (Annan)
 Eastriggs
 Carrutherstown
 Springfield
 Kirkpatrick Fleming
 Cummertrees
 St Columba's RC (Annan)

Houses
There are four "houses": Bruce, Douglas, Solway and Kinmount whose colours are blue, green, yellow and red respectively.

Sports
Annan United FC are a school football team affiliated with Annan Academy.

Notable former pupils

Edward Irving (1792–1834), Scottish clergyman.
Thomas Carlyle (1795–1881), Scottish essayist, satirist, and historian.
William Brown (1888–1975), mycologist and plant pathologist, head of botany at Imperial College.
Archie Brown (1938–), Emeritus Professor of Politics, Oxford University.
Russell Brown (1951–), Scottish Labour Party politician, Former MP for Dumfriesshire (1997-2005) and Dumfries and Galloway (UK Parliament constituency) (2005-2015).
David Gow (1957-), Bioengineer, inventor of the I-LIMB Hand.
Jim Wallace (1954–), Deputy First Minister of Scotland (1999–2005).
Emma Harper (1967–), Scottish National Party MSP for the South Scotland region.
Ashley Jensen (1969–), star of Extras and Ugly Betty.

References

External links
Annan Academy - official website homepage
Annan Academy on dumgal.gov.uk
Annan Academy on Scottish Schools Online

Educational institutions established in 1802
Secondary schools in Dumfries and Galloway
1802 establishments in Scotland
Annan, Dumfries and Galloway